Kiryat Arba or Qiryat Arba ( is an urban Israeli settlement on the outskirts of Hebron, in the southern West Bank.

The international community considers Israeli settlements illegal under international law, but the Israeli government disputes this.

Biblical town: etymology and location

In the Hebrew Bible
Kiryat Arba is mentioned in the Hebrew Bible as the former name of Hebron and as the place where Abraham's wife, Sarah, has died: "And Sarah died at Kiriath-arba (that is, Hebron)". The Book of Joshua says: "Now the name of Hebron formerly was Kiriath-arba; this Arba was the greatest man among the Anakim.". It is also one of the places listed in Nehemiah where some of the people of Judah were living. There is no reference to Hebron in Nehemiah, however.

Identification
Some researchers identify Tel Rumeida with the biblical town.

Meaning
There are various explanations for the name, not mutually exclusive. According to the biblical commentator Rashi, Kiryat Arba ("Town of Arba") means either the town (kirya) of Arba, the giant who had three sons, or the town of the four giants: Anak (the son of Arba) and his three sons – Ahiman, Sheshai and Talmai – who are described as being the sons of a "giant" in : "On the way through the Negev, they (Joshua and Caleb) came to Hebron where [they saw] Ahiman, Sheshai and Talmi, descendants of the Giant (ha-anak)..."

Some say that Anak ("giant", see Anak) is a proper name (Targum Jonathan and the Septuagint), and that he, Anak, may have been the father of the three others mentioned in the Book of Numbers as living in Hebron, previously known as "Kiryat Arba."

Alternatively, the name may refer to the four couples buried in the Cave of the Patriarchs: Abraham and Sarah, Isaac and Rebecca, Jacob and Leah, and according to the Zohar, Adam and Eve.

History 

A secret government plan to establish the settlement began with the expropriation of Palestinian land, ostensibly for a military base. According to the minutes of a meeting between senior officials in the office of Defense Minister Moshe Dayan in July 1970, houses would be constructed "for military purposes" before being turned over to Jewish civilians as a settlement. This method of settlement foundation, which was very common at the time, was intended to give the appearance of compliance with international law. Israeli settlers claimed that Jewish settlement around Hebron was justified in light of the 1929 Hebron massacre and the continuous presence of Jews in the area until then. The town is a self-sufficient community, with pre-nursery through post-secondary educational institutions, medical facilities, shopping centers, a bank, and a post office. Kiryat Arba attained local council status in 1979. While Kiryat Arba is located within the territory of the Har Hebron Regional Council, it is an independent local council.

Israeli settlers living at Kiryat Arba have been subjected to multiple attacks by Palestinians. In 1980, three 20-year-old yeshiva students studying in Kiryat Arba were among the six Jews killed by terrorists after praying in the Cave of the Patriarchs in Hebron on Friday night. Between 1981 and 1986, four people from Kiryat Arba were shot and wounded in the Hebron marketplace. In 1994, a 17-year Sarit Prigral from Kiryat Arba was shot and killed in a drive-by shooting. In March 2003, Eli and Dina Horowitz were shot to death in their home and five others wounded. On November 26, 2009, a Palestinian stabbed and wounded two Israelis at a Kiryat Arba gas station. The Palestinian was then shot dead by an Israeli soldier. On August 31, 2010, four residents, including a pregnant woman, were shot to death in their car by Hamas militants outside Kiryat Arba. The Palestinian Authority arrested the perpetrators, but promptly released them after Hamas accused it of treason. On October 8, 2010, Israeli troops killed two of the perpetrators and arrested six during a raid in Hebron. In October 2011, a Palestinian stoning attack near Kiryat Arba caused the car of a resident to overturn, killing him and his infant son. The man's handgun and wallet were then stolen. Following an investigation by Shin Bet, the IDF and police, two Palestinians from Halhul were arrested for throwing the stones that caused the car to overturn, and three others were arrested for stealing the gun. On June 30, 2016, a Palestinian from the nearby village of Bani Naim entered a house in Kiryat Arba and stabbed to death 13-year-old Hallel Yaffa Ariel, an Israeli-American girl. The attacker was shot to death, after also wounding a security guard who responded to the Ariel stabbing.

In October 2018, Eliyahu Libman was elected council head beating  Malachi Levinger, the son of Moshe Levinger, who had served as head of council for 10 years.

Landmarks
Kahane Park is named for Rabbi Meir Kahane, founder of Kach, a radical Orthodox Jewish, ultranationalist political party in Israel that is banned and considered a terrorist organization in Israel. Meir Kahane was assassinated in the United States by an Arab gunman. 
The grave of Baruch Goldstein, who committed the Cave of the Patriarchs massacre, is across the street from the park.

Education
The settlement has the following high schools and yeshivas:
 The Kiryat Arba Ulpana for girls.
 The Kiryat Arba high school Yeshiva.
 The Nir Hesder Yeshiva.

Notable residents
Sarah Avraham (b. 1993/94), Indian-born Israeli kickboxer, 2014 Women's World Thai-Boxing Champion at 57-63 kilos (125–140 pounds)
Baruch Goldstein (1956-1994), perpetrator of the Cave of the Patriarchs Massacre
Elyakim Ha'etzni (b. 1926), lawyer and former Knesset member
Moshe Levinger (1935-2015), Orthodox rabbi and Religious Zionist activist
Dov Lior (b. 1933), chief rabbi and rosh yeshiva

References

External links

The Jewish Community of Hebron
Map

 
Mixed Israeli settlements
1968 establishments in the Israeli Military Governorate
Israeli settlements in the West Bank